Life expectancy in Fiji is 66 years for men and 72 years for women.  Maternal mortality was 59 per 100 000 live births in 2013.

The Human Rights Measurement Initiative finds that Fiji is fulfilling 76.5% of what it should be fulfilling for the right to health based on its level of income. When looking at the right to health with respect to children, Fiji achieves 92.1% of what is expected based on its current income. In regards to the right to health amongst the adult population, the country achieves only 77.4% of what is expected based on the nation's level of income.  Fiji falls into the "very bad" category when evaluating the right to reproductive health because the nation is fulfilling only 60.1% of what the nation is expected to achieve based on the resources (income) it has available.

Healthcare

Fiji decided in 1977 to take a village-based approach to primary health care with a network of village health workers.  This had some effect, particularly in the improvement of water and sewage systems but the country is short of qualified doctors and nurses.  The programme has been criticised because of a lack of proper monitoring of the health standards in the communities and villages.

The secretary of Fiji's Medical Association says Fiji compares well with other developing countries. More than 70% of government spending for healthcare is for hospital services. Health financing is all from general taxation as there is no social health insurance.  In 2012 this was about 9.4% of overall government expenditure. Total health expenditure was 4% of gross domestic product in 2012.  About a third of that was private health expenditure.

There is a network of 98 nursing stations, similar to health posts and mostly in rural areas, 84 health centres, staffed by either a doctor or a nurse practitioner and 19 subdivisional hospitals across the country.  About 61% of the public spending for the nursing stations and 26% of spending for hospital inpatient care is directed to services for the poorest 20% of the population. There are also about 130 private general practitioner clinics.

The incidence of chronic kidney disease is increasing.  Renal dialysis is provided free of charge in the intensive care unit but further dialysis costs $750 per week, which is beyond the reach of most of the population.  The Kidney Dialysis Centre is a private facility.

For highly specialised healthcare, Fiji continues to rely on overseas health systems and expertise.  Such arrangements have caused controversy in the past including one episode in which the leading Fijian academic Ganesh Chand, then Vice Chancellor of Fiji National University, allegedly abused his authority by approving the payments for overseas medical treatment for the then Minister of Education and the Chairman of the Fiji National University Council, Filipe Bole.

Hospitals

There are 25 government hospitals (including two national referral hospitals) and three private hospitals providing secondary and tertiary care in Fiji.

References